Cribs may refer to:
The Cribs, a band from the United Kingdom
MTV Cribs, a reality television program on MTV

See also
Crib (disambiguation)
Crips